Parliamentary elections were held in Yemen on 27 April 2003, having been originally scheduled for 2001. The General People's Congress of President Ali Abdullah Saleh received 58% of the vote, winning 229 of the 301 seats.

Campaign
Nineteen parties fielded a total of 991 candidates for the 301 seats in the House of Representatives, in addition to 405 independent candidates. Over eight million Yemeni citizens were registered to vote, with the number of registered women voters almost doubling since 1997 (3.4 million compared to 1.8 million).

Conduct
Although the election was deemed to be more free and fair than in previous years, there were still concerns about the conduct of the vote. The National Democratic Institute noted that:
The atmosphere of anxiety in the run-up to the elections caused by fears of violence, as well as heavy-handed and coercive measures on and after election day by elements of the ruling GPC in many polling stations across the country are troubling. There were credible reports of election law violations including political intimidation, underage voting, improper behavior by security forces, vote buying and obstruction by ruling party counting commissioners.

Results
The General People's Congress was immediately joined by 12 independents. Results in three seats were invalidated. Despite the increase in the number of women voters, only one woman was elected, down from two in the 1997 elections.

References

Elections in Yemen
Parliamentary
Yemen